I Wanna See You Bellydance is a 1998 album by the Red Elvises.

Track listing 
Rocketman 
Hello from Istanbul
I Wanna See You Bellydance
Voodoo Doll
Gypsy Heart
El Nino
Hawaii
I'm not that Kind of Guy
Sad Cowboy Song
Stewardess in Red
200 Flying Girls (Rocketman's Dream)
All I Wanna Do (is make love to you)
After the Carnival

Credits 

Zhenya - guitars, vocals
Avi - drums, vocals
Igor - vocals, guitar
Oleg - bass, vocals

Guest performers:
Dimitri Mamokhin - trumpet
Gary Herbig - Sax and flute
Leo "Groovitz" Chelyapov - clarinet
Skip Waring - trombone
Chris Golden - fretless bass

Recorded at USMP Studios, Hollywood CA under the watchful ear of Svet Lazarov
Art and design by Human Fly Graphics / Go Man Go Design
With special guest Pain-in-the-ass "Art Director" Oleg Bernov

External links 
 Official site

Red Elvises albums
1999 albums